Lencina is a surname. Notable people with the surname include:

Jorge Lencina (born 1976), Argentine judoka
Julio Lencina (1939–2022), Argentine cinematographer
Marcos Lencina (born 1973), Argentine footballer

See also
Daniel Lencina-Ribes (born 1977), Lithuanian tennis player
Lencinas